Football 7-a-side at the 2012 Summer Paralympics was held in London at the Olympic Hockey Centre, from 1 September to 9 September. Football 7-a-side is played by athletes with cerebral palsy, a condition characterized by impairment of muscular coordination. 96 footballers are expected to compete for one set of medals.

For these games, the men competed in an 8-team tournament.

Qualifying

Group stage

Group A

Group B

Knockout stage

Classification round

5th–8th place semi-finals

7th–8th place match

5th–6th place match

Medal round

Semi-finals

Bronze medal match

Gold medal match

Medalists

See also
Football 5-a-side at the 2012 Summer Paralympics
Football at the 2012 Summer Olympics

References

External links
"Football 7-a-side" , The official site of the London 2012 Olympic and Paralympic Games
Cerebral Palsy International Sports & Recreation Association (CPISRA)

 
2012
2012 Summer Paralympics events
2012